Netherby is a rural locality in the Fraser Coast Region, Queensland, Australia.

History
The locality presumably takes its name from its railway station, which in turn was named by the Queensland Railways Department after the town in Scotland, thought to have some connection to a settler.

Geography
The Mary River forms the western and north-western boundaries.

References 

Fraser Coast Region
Localities in Queensland